SR 59230A is a selective antagonist of the beta-3 adrenergic receptor, but was subsequently shown to also act at α1 adrenoceptors at high doses. It has been shown to block the hyperthermia produced by MDMA in animal studies.

References

Beta blockers
Phenol ethers
Secondary alcohols
1-Aminotetralins